Yrjö Pärnänen (5 January 1931 – 1 November 2009) was a Finnish footballer. He played in four matches for the Finland national football team from 1961 to 1963.

References

1931 births
2009 deaths
Finnish footballers
Finland international footballers
Place of birth missing
Association footballers not categorized by position